Tell Us Only the Beautiful Things is an album by vibraphonist Walt Dickerson recorded in 1975 for the Japanese Whynot label.

Track listing 
All compositions by Walt Dickerson
 "The Nexus" – 22:34
 "Tell Us Only the Beautiful Things" – 18:30

Personnel 
Walt Dickerson – vibraphone
Wilbur Ware – bass
Andrew Cyrille – drums

References 

1975 albums
Walt Dickerson albums
Whynot Records albums